The 2003 Billboard Latin Music Awards, produced and broadcast live on Telemundo, were held on Thursday, May 8, 2003. The award show aired on Telemundo at 7pm EST. The awards show was held at the Miami Arena in downtown Miami, Fl.

Host
 Roselyn Sánchez

Performers
 Ricky Martin
 Chayanne
 Thalía
 Eros Ramazzotti
 Gilberto Santa Rosa
 Pilar Montenegro
 Grupo Limite
 La India
 Lupillo Rivera
 A.B. Quintanilla & Kumbia Kings
 Los Tucanes de Tijuana
 Alexandre Pires
 David Bisbal

The following list are the 2003 Billboard Latin Music Award Winners

Special awards

Billboard Latin Music Hall of Fame
 Armando Manzanero

Spirit of Hope Award
 El General

Star of the Year Award
 Ricky Martin

Your World Award (Premio Tu Mundo)
 Thalía

Hot Latin Songs of the Year

Hot Latin Song of the Year
"Y Tu Te Vas" – Chayanne

Vocal Duet or Collaboration
"Por Ese Hombre" Brenda K. Starr with Tito Nieves & Víctor Manuelle

Artist of the Year
Alexandre Pires

People

Songwriter of the Year
Estefano (10 titles)

Producer of the Year
Rudy Perez (8 titles)

Latin Pop Albums

Male
Un Día Normal – Juanes
Quizás – Enrique Iglesias
De Noche En La Ciudad – Aleks Syntek
MTV Unplugged – Alejandro Sanz

Female
Thalía – ThalíaDesahogo – Pilar Montenegro
Acústico – Ednita Nazario
Acústico Vol. II – Ednita Nazario

Duo or GroupRevolución de Amor – ManáEl Primer Instinto – Jaguares
Las Ketchup – Las Ketchup
Sin Bandera – Sin Bandera

New ArtistLas Ketchup – Las KetchupDe Pata Negra – Melody
Desahogo – Pilar Montenegro
Sin Bandera – Sin Bandera

Top Latin Albums Artist of the YearLos TemerariosJuanes
Las Ketchup
Maná

Latin Rock/Alternative Album of the YearRevolución de Amor – ManáRadio Bemba Sound System – Manu Chao
El Primer Instinto – Jaguares
Un Día Normal – Juanes

Tropical Album of the Year
MaleViceversa – Gilberto Santa RosaUrbano – Elvis Crespo
Le Preguntaba a la Luna – Víctor Manuelle
Vuela Muy Alto – Jerry Rivera

FemaleLatin Songbird: Mi Alma Y Corazon – La IndiaHecho a Mano – Albita
Pienso en así... – Milly Quezada
Temptation – Brenda K. Starr

Duo Or GroupConfesiones – Monchy y AlexandraWe Broke the Rules – Aventura
Latino – Grupo Mania
Un Gran Dia En El Barrio – Spanish Harlem Orchestra

New ArtistUn Gran Dia En El Barrio – Spanish Harlem OrchestraWe Broke the Rules – Aventura
Derroche De Amor – Raulin Rodriguez
No Es Casualidad – Yoskar Sarante

Regional Mexican Album of the Year
Male Solo ArtistAmorcito Corazon – Lupillo RiveraUn Canto de México – Alejandro Fernández
Sold Out At The Universal Amphitheatre Vol. 2 – Lupillo Rivera
Lo Dijo el Corazón – Joan Sebastian

Male Duo or GroupUna Lagrima No Basta – Los TemerariosSueños – Intocable
Perdoname Mi Amor – Conjunto Primavera
La Reina del Sur – Los Tigres del Norte

Female Group or Female Solo ArtistLibre – Jennifer PeñaSolo Tuya – Aracely Arambula
Soy Así – Grupo Límite
A Toda Onda – La Onda

New ArtistA Toda Onda'' – Grupo La OndaSolo Tuya – Aracely ArambulaEn La Esquina – Chicos de BarrioEl Rey de la Banda'' – Germán Lizárraga y su Banda Estrellas de Sinaloa

Other Latin

Latin Greatest Hits Album of the Year
"Grandes Exitos" – Chayanne

Latin Compilation Album of the Year
"Las 30 Cumbias Mas Pegadas" – Various Artists

Latin Jazz Album of the Year
"The Shadow Of The Cat" – Gato Barbieri

Latin Dance Club Play Track of the Year
"Escape/Escapar (Remixes)" – Enrique Iglesias

Latin Dance Single of the Year
"Alive (Thunderpuss Remix)" – Jennifer Lopez

Latin Rap Album of the Year
"A La Reconquista" – Héctor y Tito

Labels

Publisher of the Year
EMI April, ASCAP

Publishing Corporation of the Year
EMI Music Publishing

New Categories

Latin Pop Airplay Track of the Year, Male
"Y Tu Te Vas" – Chayanne

Latin Pop Airplay Track of the Year, Female
"Quitame Ese Hombre" – Pilar Montenegro

Latin Pop Airplay Track of the Year, Duo or Group
"Entra En Mi Vida" – Sin Bandera

Latin Pop Airplay Track of the Year, New Artist
"Entra En Mi Vida" – Sin Bandera

Tropical/Salsa Airplay Track of the Year, Male
"Viviendo" – Marc Anthony

Tropical/Salsa Airplay Track of the Year, Female
"Por Ese Hombre" – Brenda K. Starr

Tropical/Salsa Airplay Track of the Year, Duo or Group
"Te Quiero Igual Que Ayer" – Monchy y Alexandra

Tropical/Salsa Airplay Track of the Year, New Artist
"Asereje" – Las Ketchup

Regional Mexican Airplay Track of the Year, Male Solo Artist
"Te Solte La Rienda" – Lupillo Rivera

Regional Mexican Airplay Track of the Year, Male Group
"Perdoname Mi Amor" – Conjunto Primavera

Regional Mexican Airplay Track of the Year, Female Group or Female Solo Artist
"Quitame Ese Hombre (version nortena)" – Pilar Montenegro

Regional Mexican Airplay Track of the Year, New Artist
"Quitame Ese Hombre (version nortena)" – Pilar Montenegro

Latin Christian/Gospel Album of the Year
"Storm" – Fernando Ortega

Latin Tour of the Year
Luis Miguel

Label Awards

Hot Latin Tracks Label Of the Year
Sony

Top Latin Albums Label Of the Year
Sony

Latin Pop Airplay Label Of the Year
Sony

Tropical/Salsa Airplay Label Of the Year
Sony

Regional Mexican Airplay Label Of the Year
Fonovisa

Latin Pop Albums Label Of the Year
Sony

Tropical/Salsa Albums Label Of the Year
Sony

Regional Mexican Albums Label Of the Year
Univision Music Group

See also
Billboard Latin Music Awards
Billboard Music Award

References

Billboard Latin Music Awards
Latin Billboard Music Awards
Latin Billboard Music Awards
Billboard Music Awards
Latin Billboard Music